Luminiţa may refer to:
Luminița (name)
Port of Luminița in Romania
Luminița River in Romania
 Luminiţa, a village in Corbu Commune, Constanţa County, Romania
 Luminiţa, a village in Topolog Commune, Tulcea County, Romania
 Luminiţa, a village in Valea-Trestieni Commune, Nisporeni district, Moldova